The 1998–1999 LEB season was the third season of the Liga Española de Baloncesto, second tier of the Spanish basketball.

LEB standings

LEB Playoffs
The two winners of the semifinals are promoted to Liga ACB.

Relegation playoffs

Relegation system
There were not directly relegations of the last qualified teams in the league. If a team is between the two last teams during three seasons, losses its berth.

References
All scores on FEB.es

See also 
Liga Española de Baloncesto

LEB Oro seasons
1998–99 in Spanish basketball leagues
Second level Spanish basketball league seasons